Solid sorbents for carbon capture include a diverse range of porous, solid-phase materials, including mesoporous silicas, zeolites, and metal-organic frameworks. These have the potential to function as more efficient alternatives to amine gas treating processes for selectively removing CO2 from large, stationary sources including power stations. While the technology readiness level of solid adsorbents for carbon capture varies between the research and demonstration levels, solid adsorbents have been demonstrated to be commercially viable for life-support and cryogenic distillation applications. While solid adsorbents suitable for carbon capture and storage are an active area of research within materials science, significant technological and policy obstacles limit the availability of such technologies.

Overview 

The combustion of fossil fuels generates over 13 gigatons of CO2 per year. Concern over the effects of CO2 with respect to climate change and ocean acidification led governments and industries to investigate the feasibility of technologies that capture the resultant CO2 from entering the carbon cycle. For new power plants, technologies such as pre-combustion and oxy-fuel combustion may simplify the gas separation process.

However, existing power plants require the post-combustion separation of CO2 from the flue gas with a scrubber. In such a system, fossil fuels are combusted with air and CO2 is selectively removed from a gas mixture also containing N2, H2O, O2 and trace sulphur, nitrogen and metal impurities. While exact separation conditions are fuel and technology dependent, in general CO2 is present at low concentrations (4-15% v/v) in gas mixtures near atmospheric pressure and at temperatures of approximately -60 °C. Sorbents for carbon capture are regenerated using temperature, pressure or vacuum, so that CO2 can be collected for sequestration or utilization and the sorbent can be reused.

The most significant impediment to carbon capture is the large amount of electricity required. Without policy or tax incentives, the production of electricity from such plants is not competitive with other energy sources. The largest operating cost for power plants with carbon capture is the reduction in the amount of electricity produced, because energy in the form of steam is diverted from making electricity in the turbines to regenerating the sorbent. Thus, minimizing the amount of energy required for sorbent regeneration is the primary goal behind much carbon capture research.

Metrics 

Significant uncertainty exists around the total cost of post-combustion CO2 capture because full-scale demonstrations of the technology have yet to come online.  Thus, individual performance metrics are generally relied upon when comparisons are made between different adsorbents. 

Regeneration energy—Generally expressed in energy consumed per weight of CO2 captured (e.g. 3,000 kJ/kg). These values, if calculated directly from the latent and sensible heat components of regeneration, measure the total amount of energy required for regeneration.

Parasitic energy—Similar to regeneration energy, but measures how much usable energy is lost. Owing to the imperfect thermal efficiency of power plants, not all of the heat required to regenerate the sorbent would actually have produced electricity.

Adsorption capacity—The amount of CO2 adsorbed onto the material under the relevant adsorption conditions.

Working capacity—The amount of CO2 that can be expected to be captured by a specified amount of adsorbent during one adsorption–desorption cycle. This value is generally more relevant than the total adsorption capacity.

Selectivity—The calculated ability of an adsorbent to preferentially adsorb one gas over another gas. Multiple methods of reporting selectivity have been reported and in general values from one method are not comparable to values from another method. Similarly, values are highly correlated to temperature and pressure.

Comparison to aqueous amine absorbents 

Aqueous amine solutions absorb CO2 via the reversible formation of ammonium carbamate, ammonium carbonate and ammonium bicarbonate. The formation of these species and their relative concentration in solution is dependent upon the specific amine or amines as well as the temperature and pressure of the gas mixture. At low temperatures, CO2 is preferentially absorbed by the amines and at high temperatures CO2 is desorbed. While liquid amine solutions have been used industrially to remove acid gases for nearly a century, amine scrubber technology is still under development at the scale required for carbon capture.

Advantages 
Multiple advantages of solid sorbents have been reported. Unlike amines, solid sorbents can selectively adsorb CO2 without the formation of chemical bonds (physisorption). The significantly lower heat of adsorption for solids requires less energy for the CO2 to desorb from the material surface. Also, two primary or secondary amine molecules are generally required to absorb a single CO2 molecule in liquids. For solid surfaces, large capacities of CO2 can be adsorbed. For temperature swing adsorption processes, the lower heat capacity of solids has been reported to reduce the sensible energy required for sorbent regeneration. Many environmental concerns over liquid amines can be eliminated by the use of solid adsorbents.

Disadvantages 
Manufacturing costs are expected to be significantly greater than the cost of simple amines. Because flue gas contains trace impurities that degrade sorbents, solid sorbents may prove to be prohibitively expensive. Significant engineering challenges must be overcome. Sensible energy required for sorbent regeneration cannot be effectively recovered if solids are used, offsetting their significant heat capacity savings. Additionally, heat transfer through a solid bed is slow and inefficient, making it difficult and expensive to cool the sorbent during adsorption and heat it during desorption. Lastly, many promising solid adsorbents have been measured only under ideal conditions, which ignores the potentially significant effects H2O can have on working capacity and regeneration energy.

Physical adsorbents 
Carbon dioxide adsorbs in appreciable quantities onto many porous materials through van der Waals interactions. Compared to N2, CO2 adsorbs more strongly because the molecule is more polarizabable and possesses a larger quadrupole moment. However, stronger adsorptives including H2O often interfere with the physical adsorption mechanism. Thus, discovering porous materials that can selectively bind CO2 under flue gas conditions using only a physical adsorption mechanism is an active research area.

Zeolites 

Zeolites, a class of porous aluminosilicate solids, are currently used in a wide variety of industrial and commercial applications including CO2 separation. The capacities and selectivities of many zeolites are among the highest for adsorbents that rely upon physisorption. For example, zeolite Ca-A (5A) has been reported to display both a high capacity and selectivity for CO2 over N2 under conditions relevant for carbon capture from coal flue gas, although it has not been tested in the presence of H2O. Industrially, CO2 and H2O can be co-adsorbed on a zeolite, but high temperatures and a dry gas stream are required to regenerate the sorbent.

Metal-organic frameworks 

Metal-organic frameworks (MOFs) are promising adsorbents. Sorbents displaying a diverse set of properties have been reported. MOFs with extremely large surface areas are generally not among the best for CO2 capture compared to materials with at least one adsorption site that can polarize CO2. For example, MOFs with open metal coordination sites function as Lewis acids and strongly polarize CO2. Owing to CO2's greater polarizability and quadrupole moment, CO2 is preferentially adsorbed over many flue gas components such as N2. However, flue gas contaminants such as H2O often interfere. MOFs with specific pore sizes, tuned specifically to preferentially adsorb CO2 have been reported. 2015 studies using dolomite based solid sorbents and the MgO-based or CaO-based sorbent showed high capability and durability at elevated temperatures and pressures.

Chemical adsorbents

Amine impregnated solids 
Frequently, porous adsorbents with large surface areas, but only weak adsorption sites, lack sufficient capacity for CO2 under realistic conditions. To increase low pressure CO2 adsorption capacity, adding amine functional groups to highly porous materials has been reported to result in new adsorbents with higher capacities. This strategy has been analyzed for polymers, silicas, activated carbons and metal-organic frameworks. Amine impregnated solids utilize the well-established acid-base chemistry of CO2 with amines, but dilute the amines by containing them within the pores of solids rather than as H2O solutions. Amine impregnated solids are reported to maintain their adsorption capacity and selectivity under humid test conditions better than alternatives. For example, a 2015 study of 15 solid adsorbent candidates for CO2 capture found that under multicomponent equilibrium adsorption conditions simulating humid flue gas, only adsorbents functionalized with alkylamines retained a significant capacity for CO2.

Notable adsorbents

References 

Carbon capture and storage